Nawab Muhammad Ali Khan Bahadur (1750 – 20 September 1794) was the eldest son of Faizullah Khan and briefly Nawab of Rampur between 24 July and 11 August 1793 when he was deposed by his younger brother Ghulam Muhammad Khan Bahadur and exiled to Dungarpur. He died there a year later as a prisoner when he was shot in his sleep. His only son, Ahmad Ali Khan Bahadur, later became Nawab of Rampur.

References

Nawabs of Rampur
Rohilla
Indian Shia Muslims
Nawabs of India
1750 births

1794 deaths